Chris Phillips (born October 8, 1969) is an American politician who was elected to the West Virginia House of Delegates in 2018 as a Republican. He represents District 47.

Early life 
Phillips was born in Buckhannon, West Virginia and attended Philip Barbour High School in Barbour County, West Virginia.

Political career 
Phillips was elected to the West Virginia House of Delegates in 2018.

References 

Living people
1969 births
21st-century American politicians
Republican Party members of the West Virginia House of Delegates
People from Buckhannon, West Virginia